Ana Monteagudo Ponce de Leon, OP (26 July 1602 – 10 January 1686), also known as Ana (or Ann) of the Angels Monteagudo, was a Peruvian Catholic nun from the Dominicans. 

Monteagudo studied under nuns in her childhood and decided to become one following a vision she had of Catherine of Siena showing her the Dominican habit. Her parents made the effort to dissuade her from this though she continued to pursue that path until she was inducted as a member of the Dominicans. She became noted for her holiness and held leadership positions due to her wisdom and the esteem that others had for her.

Pope John Paul II beatified Monteagudo in 1985 upon his apostolic trip to Peru.

Life
Ana Monteagudo Ponce de Leon was born in mid-1602 in Peru as the fourth of eight children to the Spanish-born Sebastián Monteagudo de la Jara and the Peruvian Francisca Ponce de Leon. Her brother Francisco became a priest. Her other siblings were:
 Mariana (married Gabriel López de Pastrana)
 Catalina (married Gonzalo Tamayo)
 Juana
 Inées (married Bernardino de Meneses)
 Andrea
 Sebastián

Monteagudo was educated at the Santa Catalina de Siena convent in Arequipa, Peru since her parents entrusted her to the care of the nuns there in 1605 and returned home in 1616 before deciding to become a nun. Yet it was at this stage that her parents wanted to give her in marriage though while home a vision of Saint Catherine of Siena showing her a Dominican habit prompted her to leave home. The child Domingo led her to the convent before her parents discovered what she had done. The pair tried to dissuade her and offered her jewels though she refused each offer. Her father soon came to accept and support her decision though her furious mother never did and forbade her to ever return home. She became a postulant of the Dominican Nuns in 1616 despite the objections of her parents and became a full member of it later in 1618. Monteagudo served as the convent's sacristan from her profession until 1632 when she was made the novice mistress and held that post until 1645 when she was named as its prioress.

King Philip IV of Spain, who was a secular Dominican himself, appeared to Monteagudo after his death in 1665 and asked for her intercession while later revealing to her that he had entered Heaven three days after his death following her prayers. She admired and was devoted to Saint Nicholas of Tolentino and beheld a vision of the Blessed Virgin Mary, the saint, and a legion of angels where the saint showed her the purgatory.

The nun died in 1686 and her remains were interred in the convent where she resided for most of her life. The final decade saw her struggle with a disease that had rendered her blind and frail.

Beatification
The informative phase of the beatification cause opened soon after her death on 17 July 1686 and later concluded at an unspecified time while an apostolic process later opened and concluded its work on 18 December 1903. Monteagudo was named a Servant of God under Pope Benedict XV on 13 June 1917 after the formal introduction to the cause; Pope Paul VI later confirmed her heroic virtue and named her as Venerable.

Pope John Paul II acknowledged a single miracle attributed to her intercession in a decree issued on 30 March 1981 and thus approved her beatification. This took place sometime later on 2 February 1985 when the pope visited Peru.

The current postulator for this cause is the Dominican priest Vito Tomás Gómez García.

See also
 Santa Catalina da Siena Monastery

References

External links
 Hagiography Circle
 Saints SQPN
 Web Archive (Spanish) 
 Santa Catalina Official Site (Spanish & English)
 Encyclopedia.com

1602 births
1686 deaths
17th-century venerated Christians
17th-century Peruvian people
Peruvian beatified people
Beatifications by Pope John Paul II
Dominican beatified people
Dominican nuns
People from Arequipa
Peruvian Roman Catholic religious sisters and nuns
Peruvian Dominicans
Venerated Catholics
Venerated Dominicans